Ernest Jeremiah Chukwuma (born 29 August 1985) is a retired Nigerian  footballer who played as a forward. He scored a hat-trick on his debut for East Bengal in 2004 vs Sporting Clube de Goa. He has played for Persipura Jayapura and Persidafon Dafonsoro after playing for Super Hangzhou Greentown. In 2012, he returned to Indonesia and played for Persiba Bantul in the Indonesian Premier League.

References

1985 births
Living people
Nigerian footballers
Expatriate footballers in Indonesia
Nigerian expatriates in Indonesia
Persipura Jayapura players
Persidafon Dafonsoro players
Liga 1 (Indonesia) players
Indonesian Super League-winning players
Expatriate footballers in China
Chinese Super League players
Zhejiang Professional F.C. players
Association football forwards
Sportspeople from Warri